Yanair is an airline headquartered in Kyiv, Ukraine and based at Kyiv International Airport (Zhuliany). Maintenance for the company's fleet is provided at Zhytomyr Airport.

History
Yanair's Air Operator's Certificate was suspended effective 7 June 2019 by Ukraine's CAA after a comprehensive inspection following an incident on 19 April 2019 involving flight 9U-746 from Istanbul to Chisinau. The airline resumed flights on 18 June 2019 following restoration of its air operator certificate.

Destinations
In June 2018, Yanair served the following scheduled destinations  with additional charter services being on offer not shown here.

Yerevan – Zvartnots International Airport

Batumi – Batumi International Airport
Tbilisi – Tbilisi International Airport

 
Tel Aviv – Ben Gurion International Airport

Kraków – John Paul II International Airport Kraków–Balice seasonal

Kyiv – Kyiv International Airport (Zhuliany) base
Odessa – Odesa International Airport focus city

As of June 2021, Yanair serves the following scheduled destinations:

Batumi – Batumi International Airport

Fleet

As of August 2022, Yanair operates the following aircraft:

References

External links

Official website

Airlines of Ukraine
Airlines established in 2012
2012 establishments in Ukraine